Jairo Randolfo Arreola Silva (born 20 September 1985) is a Guatemalan footballer who plays as a striker for Liga Nacional club Xinabajul.

Club career
At the club level, Arreola began his career with Comunicaciones on 31 January 2005.

International career
Arreola made his debut for Guatemala as a substitute on 9 June 2007 CONCACAF Gold Cup match against El Salvador. By June 2012, he had earned a total of eleven caps, scoring no goals. On 6 September 2016, Arreola scored his first goal in a 2018 FIFA World Cup qualification match against Saint Vincent and the Grenadines.

International goals
Scores and results list Guatemala's goal tally first.

Honours
Comunicaciones 
Liga Nacional de Guatemala: Apertura 2009, Clausura 2011, Apertura 2011, Clausura 2013, Apertura 2013, Clausura 2014, Apertura 2014, Clausura 2015

Antigua
Liga Nacional de Guatemala: Apertura 2018, Clausura 2019

References

External links
Jairo Arreola profile at Comunicaciones

1985 births
Living people
People from Guatemala Department
Guatemalan footballers
Association football forwards
Guatemala international footballers
Comunicaciones F.C. players
Antigua GFC players
2007 CONCACAF Gold Cup players
2011 Copa Centroamericana players
2011 CONCACAF Gold Cup players
2013 Copa Centroamericana players
2014 Copa Centroamericana players
2015 CONCACAF Gold Cup players
2021 CONCACAF Gold Cup players